Rio Cinema may refer to:

Rio Cinema (Burnham on Crouch)
Rio Cinema (Dalston)